Xiao Han (: born September 7, 1994 in Jilin) is a Chinese female short track speed skater. She won the gold medal for 777 meters in the 12th China National Winter Games in 2012.

References

1994 births
Living people
Chinese female speed skaters
Chinese female short track speed skaters
Sportspeople from Jilin
20th-century Chinese women
21st-century Chinese women